João Pedro de Oliveira Janeiro (born 29 June 1981), known simply as João Janeiro, is a Portuguese professional manager. He was most recently with Hungarian first division team Debreceni VSC, but has also managed Slovak team Dunajská Streda, and Hungarian teams Kisvárda and Szeged.

Career

Debrecen 
On 27 June 2022, he was appointed as the new coach of Nemzeti Bajnokság I club Debreceni VSC. His team drew four time and lost twice in the 2022-23 Nemzeti Bajnokság I. On 30 August 2022, his team lost to Zalaegerszegi TE 4-2. The following day, on 31 August 2022, he was sacked from Debreceni VSC.

References

External links
 

1981 births
Living people
Portuguese football managers
Liga Portugal 2 managers
Slovak Super Liga managers
FC DAC 1904 Dunajská Streda managers
Portuguese expatriate football managers
Portuguese expatriate sportspeople in Slovakia
Kisvárda FC managers
Portuguese expatriate sportspeople in Hungary
Nemzeti Bajnokság I managers
Expatriate football managers in Hungary
Footballers from Lisbon